Saint Clare may refer to:

People
Saint Clare of Assisi (1194–1253), the founder of the Poor Clares and companion of Saint Francis of Assisi
Saint Clare of Montefalco (1268–1308), the Italian abbess also called Saint Clare of the Cross

Other uses
MV St Clare, a car ferry operating between Portsmouth and the Isle of Wight, England
St. Clare Castle, a mansion in Appley on the Isle of Wight, England
St. Clare's (series), a series of children's books by Enid Blyton
St. Clare Entertainment, an American television production company

See also
St. Clare's (disambiguation)
St. Clare's Church (disambiguation)
St. Clare's Convent (disambiguation)
St. Clare's Hospital (disambiguation)
St. Clare's Monastery (disambiguation)
St Clare's School (disambiguation)
St Clears, Carmarthenshire, Wales
Saint Clair (disambiguation)
St. Claire (disambiguation)
Santa Chiara (disambiguation)
Santa Clara (disambiguation)